Power to the People may refer to:

Music
Power to the People (Joe Henderson album)
Power to the People (Poison album)
Power to the People: The Hits, a 2010 compilation album by John Lennon
"Power to the People" (song), 1971, by John Lennon
"Power to the People" (Poison song)
"Power to the People", a song by Public Enemy

Politics
Power to the people (slogan)
Power to the People (Transnistria), in Moldova
Power to the People (Russia), a defunct political party in Russia
Power to the People (Italy), a political party in Italy

Other uses
Power to the People (book), 2007, by Laura Ingraham
"Power to the People" (Yes, Prime Minister, a television episode
Power to the People, a strength training method and philosophy introduced by Pavel Tsatsouline
Power to the People, the weapons upgrade station in the Bioshock video game series

See also
 All Power to the People (film), a 1997 documentary
"(For God's Sake) Give More Power to the People", a 1971 song and album by The Chi-Lites
People Power (disambiguation)